Marcelle Keet, born 25 October 1984) is a former water polo player and field hockey player from South Africa.

Personal
She has an older sister Lee-Anne Keet who was also an international water polo player and was also part of the South African national team. Marcelle Keet studied at the Clarendon High School for Girls in East London, Eastern Cape, South Africa. Her father Russell Keet was a former canoeing player.

Career

Field hockey
Marcelle Keet was part of the South African field hockey team at the 2010 Commonwealth Games in Delhi, India, where they finished 4th. She also played at the 2010 Women's Hockey World Cup finishing 10th. She was also a member of the South African team which finished at ninth position at the 2014 Women's Hockey World Cup.

Water polo
Marcelle Keet was part of the South African water polo team at the 2013 World Aquatics Championships in Barcelona, Spain, where they finished 15th. Her sister Lee-Anne Keet was also part of the team. She also took part at the 2017 World Aquatics Championships.

See also
 South Africa at the 2013 World Aquatics Championships

References

External links

 profile at d2010results

South African female water polo players
Living people
Place of birth missing (living people)
1984 births
Field hockey players at the 2010 Commonwealth Games
Commonwealth Games competitors for South Africa
South African female field hockey players
Alumni of Clarendon High School for Girls